Struthiopteris spicant, syn. Blechnum spicant, is a species of fern in the family Blechnaceae, known by the common names hard-fern or deer fern.  It is native to Europe, western Asia, northern Africa, and western North America. Like some other species in the family Blechnaceae, it has two types of leaves. The sterile leaves have flat, wavy-margined leaflets 5 to 8 millimeters wide, while the fertile leaves have much narrower leaflets, each with two thick rows of sori on the underside.

The Latin specific epithet spicant is of uncertain origin, possibly referring to a tufted or spiky habit.

It has gained the Royal Horticultural Society's Award of Garden Merit.

The species was first described in 1753 by Carl Linnaeus as Osmunda spicant. It has been placed in a wide range of genera, including Blechnum (as Blechnum spicant). In the Pteridophyte Phylogeny Group classification of 2016 (PPG I), it is placed in the genus Struthiopteris, in the subfamily Blechnoideae.

References

External links
Video footage of Struthiopteris spicant

Blechnaceae
Ferns of the Americas
Ferns of Europe
Ferns of Africa
Ferns of Asia